Maurice Shanley (born 14 September 1999) is an Irish Gaelic footballer who plays for Premier Senior Championship club Clonakilty and at inter-county level with the Cork senior football team. He usually lines out as a full-back.

Playing career

Cork

Shanley first lined out for Cork when he was drafted onto the Cork under-20 team for the 2018 Munster Under-20 Championship. He made his first appearance for the team on 16 June 2018 when he played at midfield in the 1–20 to 0–08 defeat of Tipperary. He was switched to right wing-forward for the subsequent 3–11 to 0–14 defeat by Kerry in the Munster final.

Once again eligible for the under-20 the following year, Shanley won a Munster Under-20 Championship medal on 18 July 2019 after being selected at full-back in the 3–16 to 0–12 defeat of Kerry in the final. He was again selected at full-back when Cork defeated Dublin by 3–16 to 1–14 to claim the All-Ireland Under-20 Championship.

Shanley was drafted onto the Cork senior team for the 2020 McGrath Cup. He made his National League debut on 1 March 2020 when he was selected at full-back in a 3–13 to 3–11 win over Derry.

Career statistics

Honours

Cork
National Football League Division 3 (1): 2020
All-Ireland Under-20 Football Championship (1): 2019
Munster Under-20 Football Championship (1): 2019

References

1999 births
Living people
Clonakilty Gaelic footballers
Cork inter-county Gaelic footballers